Baoringdao Bodo (born 17 October 1999) is an Indian professional footballer who plays as a winger for I-League club TRAU.

He became India's youngest player in history to play, upon making his senior debut in January 2017. Born in Assam, Bodo represented the India under-19 team and captained the nation at under-17 level.

Early career

Born to a Dimasa Kachari family in the town of Haflong, Dima Hasao, 
Assam, Bodo started playing football at the age of 8 and then his father Mr. Jibon Bodo enrolled him at SAI Guwahati for better football training. In 2013, Bodo was selected for India camp for under 14. He joined AIFF Regional Academy in Kalyani, Kolkata under coach Gautam Ghosh. Bodo was the part of India U16 squad which has won the 2013 SAFF U-16 Championship and also AFC U16 Championship Qualifiers in 2014. Bodo improved a lot then he was promoted to AIFF Elite Academy in Goa. There he has represented India U19 in I-League U18, Subroto Cup and IFA Shield.

Club career

Chennaiyin

In May 2016, Bodo along with four AIFF Elite Academy boys signed with former ISL Champions Chennaiyin FC on a long-term contract. Bodo became the youngest player to ever contracted with any ISL club.

Minerva Punjab (Loan)

On 1 January 2017, Minerva signed Bodo on loan from Chennaiyin FC for 2016-17 I-League season. On 21 January 2017, Bodo made his league debut, coming-on as 46th-minute substitute for Kamalpreet Singh in an away match against Shillong Lajong at the Jawaharlal Nehru Stadium, Shillong. He made his first start for the club against Mumbai FC at the Guru Nanak Stadium in Ludhiana where he also scored for the club and become the Youngest player to ever score in I-League.

Kerala Blasters
On 23 January 2019, Bodo made a permanent transfer to Kerala Blasters FC on a long-term deal.

Odisha FC
On 11 June 2020, Bodo signed a two–year deal with Odisha FC.

International
Bodo first represented India at the under-14 level. He was part of the under-16 side that won the 2013 SAFF U-16 Championship and participated in the qualifiers for the AFC U-16 Championship. Bodo then went on to represent the under-19 side in the IFA Shield where he was adjudged MVP of the tournament and Top scorer of the tournament.

Style of play
Former AIFF Academy coach Gautam Ghosh has described Bodo as "a really talented player with a bright footballing brain" who has the versatility to play as a winger on either flank, as a playmaker or as a striker. Bodo has been praised for his aerial ability, creativity, and bursts of acceleration. He has been referred to as a Neymar and has also been called the Indian Neymar Jr. by mainly Indian media.

Career statistics

Club

Honours

International
India
SAFF U-16 Championship: 2013

Club
AIFF Elite Academy
I-League U18: 2015–16

Chennaiyin FC
 Indian Super League: 2017–18

Individual
IFA Shield MVP: 2016
IFA Shield Top Scorer: 2016

References

External links 
 

1999 births
Living people
People from Dima Hasao district
Indian footballers
Chennaiyin FC players
RoundGlass Punjab FC players
Association football midfielders
Footballers from Assam
Indian Super League players
India youth international footballers
Kerala Blasters FC players
AIFF Elite Academy players
I-League players
Gokulam Kerala FC players
I-League 2nd Division players
FC Bengaluru United players
Odisha FC players
Kerala Blasters FC Reserves and Academy players
TRAU FC players